41st Brigade or 41st Infantry Brigade may refer to:

 41 Canadian Brigade Group, a unit of the Canadian Army
 41st Indian Brigade of the British Indian Army in the First World War
 41st Fires Brigade (United States), a unit of the United States Army
 41st Infantry Brigade Combat Team (United States), a unit of the United States Army

 United Kingdom
 41st Brigade (United Kingdom)
 Artillery Brigades
 41st Brigade Royal Field Artillery

See also
 41st Division (disambiguation)
 41st Regiment (disambiguation)
 41st Battalion (disambiguation)
 41st Squadron (disambiguation)